Prashant Kore (born 6 October 1995) is an Indian cricketer. He made his List A debut for Maharashtra in the 2017–18 Vijay Hazare Trophy on 21 February 2018.

References

External links
 

1995 births
Living people
Indian cricketers
Place of birth missing (living people)
Maharashtra cricketers